is a railway station in the city of Gujō, Gifu Prefecture, Japan, operated by the third sector railway operator Nagaragawa Railway.

Lines

Station layout
Gujō-Hachiman Station has one ground-level side platform and one ground-level island platform connected to the station building by a footbridge. The station is staffed.

Platforms

Adjacent stations

|-
!colspan=5|Nagaragawa Railway

History
Gujō-Hachiman  Station was opened on December 8, 1929. Operations were transferred from the Japan National Railway (JNR) to the Nagaragawa Railway on December 11, 1986.

Surrounding area
Nagara River

See also
 List of Railway Stations in Japan

References

External links

 

Railway stations in Japan opened in 1929
Railway stations in Gifu Prefecture
Stations of Nagaragawa Railway
Gujō, Gifu